King's Field IV, released in North America as King's Field: The Ancient City, is an action role-playing video game developed by FromSoftware for the PlayStation 2 in 2001. It is the fourth and final game in the King's Field series. It was released in North America by Agetec in 2002 and in Europe by Metro3D in 2003.

Plot
In the land of Heladin, something is amiss. Their king, smitten by a strange idol that was given to him as a gift, lies dying. The country was enveloped with a strange sorrow, a certain darkness that stains the soul of man. Ever since the idol was brought into the kingdom, the once prosperous nation fell into a state of corruption and decay. Fearing for the life of his king and home, the sword master Septiego took a battalion of his best men to return the idol which was believed to be the source of this tragedy. Alas, the party was neither seen nor heard from again. The idol was presumed lost forever, but the decay of the nation continued.

Meanwhile, in the adjoining kingdom of Azalin, a shrouded figure appears at the doorstep of Prince Devian. From within his cloak, the dark stranger produced the object of Heladin's corruption: The Idol of Sorrow. The idol was originally taken from the ruined depths of the Holy Land, now known as the Land of Disaster, and given to the unsuspecting king of Heladin. If the idol remained outside of the ancient city, Heladin, and possibly Azalin, was doomed to mirror the twisted metropolis that spanned the vast caverns of the Land of Disaster.

With strong resolve, Devian embarked on his quest to return the cursed idol and return prosperity and vitality to his neighboring kingdom. His adventure though the ancient city would lead him to many discoveries long since lost after the collapse of the Holy Land. He would encounter the last vestiges of Septiego's troupe, and eventually discover their master's fate. Prince Devian would learn about the ancient and wise Forest Folk, the neighboring Earth Folk, and their war against the nightmarish Dark Folk. All of these secrets and more would be revealed to the young Prince, but does he have the strength of heart to harbor such monstrous truths?

Reception

The game received "mixed" reviews according to the review aggregation website Metacritic. In Japan, Famitsu gave it a score of 30 out of 40.

References

External links
Official website

2001 video games
Agetec games
King's Field
PlayStation 2 games
PlayStation 2-only games
Role-playing video games
Single-player video games
Video games about curses
Video games developed in Japan
Metro3D games